PSG can refer to:

Businesses and organizations
 Pacific Seabird Group, an ornithological society
 Pagan Spirit Gathering, a US festival
 Paramount Stations Group, former US TV owner
 Social Equality Party (Germany) (former Partei für Soziale Gleichheit)
 Guianese Socialist Party (French Parti socialiste guyanais)
 Peru Support Group, a UK-based advocacy organisation
 Pfadfinderinnenschaft Sankt Georg, a German Girl Scout association
 Presidential Security Group, Philippines
 Problem-Solving Group, in IT
 Progressive Senate Group, Canada
 Movement of Free Citizens (Pokret slobodnih građana), a political party in Serbia

Academic
 PSG College of Arts and Science, Coimbatore, Tamil Nadu, India
 PSG College of Technology, Coimbatore, Tamil Nadu, India
 Philippine School in Greece

Places
 Petersburg James A. Johnson Airport, Alaska, US, IATA code

Science and technology
 Phosphosilicate glass
 Polysomnography, sleep study
 Programmable sound generator, a sound chip

Firearms
PSG-1, a rifle
Psg-90, the Swedish version of the Accuracy International Arctic Warfare rifle

Sport
 Paris Saint-Germain F.C., a French football club
 Paris Saint-Germain Féminines, its women's team
 Paris Saint-Germain Academy
 Paris Saint-Germain Handball
 Paris Saint-Germain Rugby League, a former rugby league club
 Pasargad F.C., a Filipino football club

Other uses
 Particular social group, UN refugee category
 Platoon sergeant, senior enlisted member of a platoon